Heromorphus howanus is a species of beetles in the family Buprestidae, the only species in the genus Heromorphus.

References

Buprestidae genera